Zindagi is the title of Zubeen Garg's 2007 album. The album also has Shafqat Amanat Ali and Chithra lending their voices.

Track listing
All song were composed by Alaap Dudul Saikia.

References

2007 albums
Zubeen Garg albums